Lake Zurich is a village in Lake County, Illinois, United States, a northwest suburb of Chicago. Per the 2020 census, the population was 19,759. The village is named after a body of water named "Lake Zurich," which is completely located inside the village.

Geography

History
The area of Lake Zurich was first settled by European descendants in the 1830s. Two early pioneers were George Ela, after whom the Ela township is named, and Seth Paine, who established a number of commercial ventures in the town. New England farmers moved to the area in the 1830s and 1840s, and German immigrants began to move to the area later in the middle of the 19th century. The lake now known as Lake Zurich was named Cedar Lake at the time. The village of Lake Zurich was incorporated on September 29, 1896. It remained primarily a farming community; although the village was connected to the railroad in 1910, the line was closed ten years later. However, the arrival of the highway system with Rand Road (U.S. Route 12) in 1922 and Half Day Road (Illinois Route 22) in 1927 established Lake Zurich as a convenient summer resort. The now-defunct Palatine, Lake Zurich and Wauconda Railroad also served the community. Housing development began in the 1950s, with the population increasing throughout the latter part of the 20th century.

In 1988, a historic, landmark legal case in Illinois took place settling a dispute on Lake Zurich, thereby clarifying throughout Illinois property owners' rights on private lakes. In 1988, the Illinois Supreme Court ruled in Beacham v. Lake Zurich Property Owners Association (123 Ill. 2d 227; 526 N.E.2d 154; 1988 Ill. LEXIS 91; 122 Ill. Dec 14, filed June 20, 1988) that each individual owner of the private (aka non-public) lake's bottom has the legal right to recreate over the surface waters of the entire private lake.  The High Court ruled that by ownership of a lake bottom land, each partial-lake-bottom owner of a private lake can not be prohibited from recreating on the surface waters that may be located above other owners' lake bottom properties.  Riparian land rights were defined in Illinois.

Eminent domain controversy
The village government has used eminent domain to obtain properties in an attempt to increase downtown revenue via new businesses. As of 2004 Lake Zurich had acquired all the property intended to fulfill its downtown redevelopment project. While many protests occurred regularly throughout 2005 near the promenade, the protests failed to garner much attention and ended up failing. A 2007 court defeat brought the issue back into the public eye, as a village-owned rental parcel was denied eminent domain. The renters were granted the ability to stay through the end of their lease due to clerical errors made by the village's legal and administrative employees regarding this parcel in particular.

Demographics

2020 census

Note: the US Census treats Hispanic/Latino as an ethnic category. This table excludes Latinos from the racial categories and assigns them to a separate category. Hispanics/Latinos can be of any race.

2000 Census
As of the census of 2000, there were 18,104 people, 5,746 households, and 4,866 families residing in the village. The racial makeup of the village was 92.31% White, 0.81% African American, 0.17% Native American, 3.82% Asian, 0.01% Pacific Islander, 1.97% from other races, and 0.92% from two or more races. Hispanic or Latino of any race were 5.55% of the population.

There were 5,746 households, out of which 54.3% had children under the age of 18 living with them, 75.3% were married couples living together, 7.1% had a female householder with no husband present, and 15.3% were non-families. 12.4% of all households were made up of individuals, and 3.5% had someone living alone who was 65 years of age or older. The average household size was 3.12 and the average family size was 3.42.

In the village, the population was spread out, with 34.1% under the age of 18, 5.0% from 18 to 24, 34.1% from 25 to 44, 21.0% from 45 to 64, and 5.9% who were 65 years of age or older. The median age was 35 years. For every 100 females, there were 100.6 males. For every 100 females age 18 and over, there were 97.4 males.

According to a 2007 estimate, the median income for a household in the village was $101,872, and the median income for a family was $108,108. Males had a median income of $63,909 versus $43,047 for females. The per capita income for the village was $30,287. About 2.0% of families and 2.5% of the population were below the poverty line, including 2.9% of those under age 18 and 5.9% of those age 65 or over.

Village government
The village of Lake Zurich is headed by Village President Thomas Poynton, who was reelected in 2017, and originally won a seat on the village board as Trustee in 2007. The village has a six-member Board of Trustees.  Mary Beth Euker was elected village trustee in 2017 to a 4-year term; Jim Beaudoin was re-elected in 2017 to 4-year terms; Jon Sprawka, Marc Spacone were elected in 2015 to 4-year terms and re-elected in 2019. Greg Weider was appointed in 2016 and elected in 2017 to a 4-year term. Janice Gannon was elected to a 4 year term in 2019. Kathleen Johnson was re-elected Village Clerk in 2017.

Popular culture
Lake Zurich is the hometown of Sandra Bullock's character Dr. Ryan Stone in the 2013 science fiction film Gravity.

Notable people

 Matt Blanchard, former National Football League player
 Leo Burnett, creator of Tony the Tiger, Charlie the Tuna, the Marlboro Man, and the Maytag Repairman, and founder of the company that would become Leo Burnett Worldwide
 Bob Parsons former National Football League player
 Al Salvi, former Illinois state legislator and 1996 Republican U.S. Senate nominee
 Phoebe Snetsinger, notable birdwatcher; raised in Lake Zurich and daughter of Leo Burnett
 Justin Tranter, songwriter and singer for Semi Precious Weapons.
 Jack Sanborn, current National Football League player for the Chicago Bears

Education

Public schools
Public schools are managed by the Lake Zurich Lake Zurich Community Unit School District 95. A small section of east Lake Zurich is served by Kildeer Countryside Community Consolidated School District 96 and Consolidated High School District 125.

Elementary schools (K-5):
 Isaac Fox
 Sarah Adams
 Seth Paine
 Spencer Loomis
 May Whitney (also Pre-K)

Until 2009, Charles Quentin Elementary School was also a school in the district, located in nearby Kildeer, that served students in Kildeer, parts of Deer Park and a small part of Lake Zurich, but it closed due to the small total number of students attending it.  The district was remapped and students attending Charles Quentin were assigned to various other schools.  The site of the former Charles Quentin school became a large part of the retail shopping center known as Kildeer Village Square.

Middle schools (6-8):
 Lake Zurich Middle School South (takes students from Fox and Adams and took students from the former Quentin School, also takes Whitney students)
 Lake Zurich Middle School North (takes students from Paine, Loomis and Whitney)

High school (9-12):
Lake Zurich High School

Non-Lake Zurich schools:
Willow Grove Kindergarten Center (K) (in Buffalo Grove)
Kildeer Countryside Elementary School (1-5) (in Long Grove)
Woodlawn Middle School (6-8) (in Long Grove)
Adlai E. Stevenson High School (9-12) (in Lincolnshire)

Private schools
 St. Francis de Sales (Catholic) (Preschool-8)
 St. Matthew (Lutheran) (K-8)
 Quentin Road Christian School (Baptist) (K-12)

See also

References

External links
 Village of Lake Zurich official website
 Ela Area Public Library

 
Chicago metropolitan area
Populated places established in 1896
Villages in Lake County, Illinois
Villages in Illinois